Battle Ground Historic District is a national historic district located at Battle Ground, Tippecanoe County, Indiana.  The district encompasses 129 contributing buildings in the central business district of Battle Ground, including the site of the Battle of Tippecanoe.  It developed between about 1811 and 1930 and includes representative examples of Queen Anne, Colonial Revival, and Bungalow / American Craftsman style architecture.  Notable contributing resources include the Soldier's Memorial (1908), Carpenter Hall / Service Center (c. 1884, 1926), Chapel (c. 1825), Winans House (c. 1863), Battle Ground United Methodist Church (1920), Masonic Lodge (c. 1918), Odd Fellow Lodge (1899), and Knights of Pythias Lodge (1899).

It was listed on the National Register of Historic Places in 1985.

References

Historic districts on the National Register of Historic Places in Indiana
Queen Anne architecture in Indiana
Bungalow architecture in Indiana
Colonial Revival architecture in Indiana
Historic districts in Tippecanoe County, Indiana
National Register of Historic Places in Tippecanoe County, Indiana